Gustavo Daniel Viera Moreira, known as Gustavo Viera (born 21 October 2000) is a Uruguayan footballer who plays as forward for Fénix on loan from Portuguese Primeira Liga side Santa Clara.

Club career
On 27 August 2021, Santa Clara announced that Viera joined Fénix on loan.

Career statistics

References

2000 births
Living people
Uruguayan footballers
Uruguay youth international footballers
Association football forwards
Liverpool F.C. (Montevideo) players
C.D. Santa Clara players
Centro Atlético Fénix players
Uruguayan Primera División players
Uruguayan expatriate footballers
Expatriate footballers in Portugal
Uruguayan expatriate sportspeople in Portugal